"Forever Autumn" is a song written by Jeff Wayne, Gary Osborne and Paul Vigrass. The original melody was written by Wayne in 1969 as a jingle for a Lego commercial. Vigrass and Osborne, the performers of the original jingle, added lyrics to the song and recorded it for inclusion on their 1972 album Queues. Their interpretation was also released as a single and gained moderate commercial success in Japan, selling more than 100,000 copies and becoming a top-20 hit on the country's record chart.

The best-known version is the recording by Justin Hayward from the album Jeff Wayne's Musical Version of The War of the Worlds. Wayne wanted to include a love song on the album that sounded like "Forever Autumn", and he decided that the best course of action was to simply use the original song. Wayne chose Hayward, of The Moody Blues, to sing it saying that he "wanted that voice from 'Nights in White Satin'". It was recorded at London's Advision Studios in 1976. The song reached #5 on the UK Singles Chart in August 1978. The single version was released on the compilation album Highlights from Jeff Wayne's Musical Version of The War of the Worlds.

A new version was released in late 2012, sung by Gary Barlow for the new album Jeff Wayne's Musical Version of The War of the Worlds – The New Generation.

Notable recordings 
 Vigrass and Osborne performed it on their 1972 album, Queues. This version also appeared as a single.
 Hayward performed it on the 1978 album Jeff Wayne's Musical Version of The War of the Worlds. A slightly different mix (notably excluding the narration from the album) was released as a single. The latter version was included in the Moody Blues' box set Time Traveller. Although sometimes falsely credited as being an original single by the Moody Blues itself, Hayward has performed the song live with that group.
 Pierre Belmonde, on the 1980 album, Themes for Dreams.
 Acker Bilk, on the 1980 album, Mellow Music.
 Paul Brett, on the 1980 album, Romantic Guitar. This version also appeared as a single.
 Peter Hayward, on the 1982 album, Hayward's Choice.
 Ronnie Aldrich, on the 1987 album, For All Seasons.
 Ed Starink, on the 1990 album Synthesizer Greatest Volume 5 and 1992 album Synthesizer Gold.
 DJ's Supreme and UFO released a happy hardcore interpolation in 1997
 Gary Barlow, on the 2012 album Jeff Wayne's Musical Version of the War of the Worlds: The New Generation.
 Luka Kuncevic, for the opening and end titles of the 2012 animated movie War of the Worlds: Goliath
 Sarah McQuaid on the 2018 album, If We Dig Any Deeper It Could Get Dangerous

Chart positions

Certifications

References

1972 songs
1978 songs
1978 singles
Justin Hayward songs
Songs with lyrics by Gary Osborne
Songs based on jingles
Songs written by Jeff Wayne